Leon del Muerte (born 1977) is a musician living in Portland, Oregon, USA. He is a founding member, guitarist and vocalist of the band Murder Construct. He is a guitarist in Terrorizer LA and Lightbreaker, vocalist in Impaled, and was previously involved with the bands Nails, Exhumed, Nausea LA, Intronaut, Phobia and Artificium Sanguis.

Discography

Demos
Infanticide - Fetal Remains (demo cassette), 1993
Impaled - From Here to Colostomy (demo cassette), 1999
Artificium Sanguis - Ye Olde Demo Taype (demo CD), 2003
Intronaut - Null (Demo CD), 2005

Albums
Impaled - The Dead Shall Dead Remain (album CD), 2000 Necropolis Records
Exhumed - Garbage Daze Re-Regurgitated (album CD), 2005 Listenable Records
Intronaut - Void (album CD), 2006 Goodfellow Records
Phobia - 22 Random Acts of Violence (album CD), 2008 Willowtip
D.I.S. (Destroyed In Seconds) - Critical Failure (album CD), 2010 Deep Six Records
Exhumed - All Guts, No Glory (album CD), 2011 Relapse Records
Murder Construct - Results (album CD), 2012 Relapse Records
Impaled - The Dead Still Dead Remain (album CD), 2013 Willowtip
Nausea (LA) - Condemned to the System (album CD), 2014 Willowtip
Phobia - Lifeless God (album CD), 2017 Willowtip

EPs
Pale Existence / Exhumed - Blood & Alcohol (7" split), 1996
Impaled / Cephalic Carnage (7" split), 1999
Impaled / Engorged (7" split), 2000
Impaled - Choice Cuts (Extended Play CD), 2001 Necropolis Records
Black Ops / Leng Tch'e - "Pain is Weakness Leaving the Body" (7" split)
Intronaut - Null: Extended Play Compact Disc (Extended Play CD), 2005 Goodfellow Records
Exhumed / Ingrowing - Something Sickened This Way Comes (7" split), Obscene Productions
Intronaut - The Challenger (Extended Play CD), 2007 Goodfellow Records
Phobia / Extinction of Mankind - Fearing the Dissolve of Humanity (Extended Play CD), 2008 Agipunk
Phobia / Gadget (7" split), 2010 Power It Up
Murder Construct - s/t (Extended Play CD), 2010 Relapse Records
Nails - I Don't Want to Know You/Endless Resistance (7" record), 2019 Nuclear Blast Records

Compilations
Exhumed - Chords of Chaos (CD), 1997
Impaled - Requiems Of Revulsion: A Tribute To Carcass (CD), 2001
Exhumed - Platters of Splatter: A Cyclopedic Symposium Of Execrable Errata And Abhorrent Apocraphya 1992-2002 (CD), 2004 Relapse Records
Murder Construct - Tribute to Disrupt (CD), 2014

Recorded guest appearances
Morbosidad - Morbosidad (guest vocals)
Dekapitator - We Will Destroy... You Will Obey!!! (guest vocals)
Exhumed - In the Name of Gore (guest vocals)
Exhumed - Slaughtercult (guest vocals)
I Klatus - Kether (guest vocals, guitar)
American Heritage - Sedentary (guest bass guitar)

Miscellaneous

Videos
Murder Construct - Red All Over
Murder Construct - The Next Life
Dreaming Dead - Overlord

Live guest appearances
Dreaming Dead - bass guitar
Nails (band) - guitar

References

American heavy metal musicians
Date of birth missing (living people)
Living people
Musicians from Portland, Oregon
1977 births
Musicians